The  is an electric multiple unit (EMU) train type operated on excursion services by Kintetsu Railway in Japan.

Formation
The train is formed as follows, consisting of four cars.

History
The 20000 series train was built in 1990. It underwent refurbishment, which included a new livery. Trial operation with the refurbished set began in August 2020.

References

External links

 Kintetsu official website 

Electric multiple units of Japan
20000 series
Double-decker EMUs

Kinki Sharyo multiple units
1500 V DC multiple units of Japan